John Irvine "Jocky" Whiteford (born 24 January 1951) is a Scottish former footballer who played for Airdrieonians, Falkirk and Dumbarton.

His father Jock, elder brother Davie (a teammate at Falkirk and Glencairn, and coaching colleague at East Stirlingshire) and cousin Derek Whiteford (a teammate at Airdrie and Dumbarton) were also footballers.

References

1951 births
Scottish footballers
Sportspeople from Shotts
Footballers from North Lanarkshire
Dumbarton F.C. players
Airdrieonians F.C. (1878) players
Falkirk F.C. players
Scottish Football League players
Living people
Association football forwards
People educated at Airdrie Academy
Association football coaches
East Stirlingshire F.C. non-playing staff
Rutherglen Glencairn F.C. players
Scottish Junior Football Association players